RPM was an American band who had released two albums during the 1980s. RPM's first album was a self-titled album released by EMI America Records in 1982 and included the AOR hit "A Legend Never Dies". Eventually, the band was invited to perform for KLOL's "Rockfest" at the Astrodome Complex in Houston, Texas.

The band's second album, Phonogenic, was released by Warner Bros. Records in 1984. A video was produced for the track, "Man Overboard". The album did not have any hits as Warner was promoting other albums at the time such as 1984 by Van Halen, Eliminator by ZZ Top, and Purple Rain by Prince.

Discography
RPM 1982 (EMI America Records)
Phonogenic 1984 (Warner Bros. Records)

References

Warner Records artists
Musical groups from Los Angeles
Musical groups established in 1982
Musical groups disestablished in 1984